The men's 200 metre butterfly at the 2007 World Aquatics Championships took place on 27 March (heats and semifinals) and on the evening of 28 March (final) at Rod Laver Arena in Melbourne, Australia. 64 swimmers were entered in the event, of which 62 swam.

Existing records at the start of the event were:
World record (WR): 1:53.71, Michael Phelps (USA), 17 February 2007 in Columbia, United States.
Championship record (CR): 1:53.98, Michael Phelps (USA), Barcelona, Spain (22 July 2003)

Results

Finals
The finals started at 19:23 on 28 March 2007

Semifinals
The semifinals started at 20:34 on 27 March 2007.

Heats
The 8 heats began at 10:27 on 27 March 2007.

Heat 1

Heat 2

Heat 3

Heat 4

Heat 5

Heat 6

Heat 7

Heat 8

See also
 Swimming at the 2005 World Aquatics Championships – Men's 200 metre butterfly
 Swimming at the 2008 Summer Olympics – Men's 200 metre butterfly
 Swimming at the 2009 World Aquatics Championships – Men's 200 metre butterfly

References

Men's 200m Fly Heats results from the 2007 World Championships. Published by OmegaTiming.com (official timer of the '07 Worlds); Retrieved 2009-07-11.
Men's 200m Fly Semifinals results from the 2007 World Championships. Published by OmegaTiming.com (official timer of the '07 Worlds); Retrieved 2009-07-11.
Men's 200m Fly Final results from the 2007 World Championships. Published by OmegaTiming.com (official timer of the '07 Worlds); Retrieved 2009-07-11.

Swimming at the 2007 World Aquatics Championships